William David Edward Davies (26 August 1906 - 1 October 1971) was a Welsh cricketer.  Davies was a right-handed batsman who bowled leg break googly.  He was born at Briton Ferry, Glamorgan.

Morgan made his first-class debut for Glamorgan in 1932 against Leicestershire.  From 1932 to 1935, he represented the county in 7 first-class matches, with his final match for the county coming against Essex.  In his 7 first-class matches, he scored 122 runs batting average of 11.09, with a high score of 32.  In the field he took 2 catches.

Davies died at the town of his birth on 1 October 1971.

References

External links
Bill Davies at Cricinfo
Bill Davies at CricketArchive

1906 births
1971 deaths
Cricketers from Briton Ferry
Welsh cricketers
Glamorgan cricketers